The Governor's Club, located at 11866 Magnolia St. in Magnolia Springs, Alabama, was listed on the National Register of Historic Places in 2000.  It is of "Coastal Cottage" architecture.

It stands on property assembled by Chicago businessman Frank Brunell during 1901 to 1908. It has also sometimes been known as "Brunell House," but there is a different house of that name, also NRHP-listed, also in Magnolia Springs, on Jessamine St.

In 2015, the house was valued at $4.79 million.

Along with Sunnyside Hotel, Governor's Club is one of two resort hotels from the 1920s era of resorts and vacations in the area. "With its spacious wrap-around porch enhanced by turned posts and balusters, floor to ceiling windows, and great interior details, the Governor’s Club stands as an important architectural survivor of Baldwin County’s early 20th century resort years."

It is also included in the Magnolia Springs Historic District, as a contributing building.

References

Houses on the National Register of Historic Places in Alabama
Houses in Baldwin County, Alabama
National Register of Historic Places in Baldwin County, Alabama
Gulf Coast cottage architecture in Alabama
Clubhouses on the National Register of Historic Places in Alabama